Live in the Moment is the fourth studio album and seventh musical release by Hong Kong singer Gin Lee, released on 8 September 2017 by Universal Music Hong Kong. Live in the Moment is a concept record, with themes of focusing on the present, and its eight tracks were recorded with a live band. Its release was preceded by the release two singles, "Flight Attendant" 空姐 and "Saying Goodbye to Every Day" 和每天講再見. A third single "Come with the Wind Gone with the Wind" 隨風而來 隨風而去 was released in November. The album was certified gold (10,000 copies sold) by the Hong Kong Recording Industry Alliance (HKRIA).

In support of the album, Live in the Moment Concert held on October 6 at the Hong Kong Convention and Exhibition Centre. A special exhibit was set up at the FWD (富衛) Passion Lab in Sheung Wan, Hong Kong from September 11 to October 7.

Singles
"Flight Attendant" 空姐 was released as the first single. It reached number one on Ultimate Song Chart.

"Saying Goodbye to Everyday" 和每天講再見 was released as the second plug. The song was well received by radio stations and reached number one on the Ultimate Song Chart in early September.

"Here I Come Here I Go" 隨風而來 隨風而去 was released to radio stations in November as the album's third single. It reached number one on 903 Ultimate and RTHK in December. The song reached number one on Metro Radio in the first week of 2018.

Track listing

Release history

References

2017 albums
Concept albums
Gin Lee albums
Cantonese-language albums